Angophora bakeri, commonly known as the narrow-leaved apple, is a species of tree that is endemic to New South Wales. It has rough, fibrous bark on the trunk and branches, lance-shaped adult leaves, flower buds in groups of three or seven, white or creamy white flowers and oval to cylindrical fruit.

Description
It has rough, fibrous grey bark on the trunk and branches. Flowering occurs from December to February and the flowers are white or creamy white.

Taxonomy and naming
Angophora bakeri was first formally described in 1913 by Edwin Cuthbert Hall in the Journal and Proceedings of the Royal Society of New South Wales. The specific epithet honours Richard Thomas Baker.

In 1986, G.J.Leach described two subspecies in the journalTelopea and the names have been accepted by the Australian Plant Census:
 Angophora bakeri subsp. bakeri has thin, flexible leaves and is widely distributed;
 Angophora bakeri subsp. crassifolia G.J.Leach has rigid, relatively thick leaves and is mostly only known from the Ku-ring-gai Chase National Park.

Distribution and habitat
Narrow-leaved apple grows in sandy soil over sandstone and is widespread and locally abundant from Port Stephens to Nowra and as far west as Katoomba. There is also a disjunct population, previously known as Angophora exul, now a synonym of A. bakeri subsp. bakeri in the Gibraltar Range National Park.

References

bakeri
Flora of New South Wales
Trees of Australia
Plants described in 1913